SV Stahl Thale is a German football club from Thale, Saxony-Anhalt. In 2013 the club had 1,012 members.

History

From the Kreisklasse to the Oberliga and East German cup winners 
SV Stahl Thale, then known as BSG EHW Thale, started playing in the Kreisklasse Quedlinburg in 1946, won the Bezirksklasse West in the 1948–49 season and achieved promotion to the DDR-Oberliga in 1950 after a 3–1 final win against BSG Hydrierwerk Zeitz and reaching third place in the promotion play-off round. They were also successful in the FDGB-Pokal, the East German cup, that year, beating BSG Finow 14–1, ZSG Schuhmetro Weißenfels 2–1 and BSG Märkische Volksstimme Babelsberg 3–2 to reach the final on 3 September 1950 at the Walter-Ulbricht-Stadion in East Berlin, where they beat fourth-placed Oberliga team BSG KWU Erfurt 4–0 in front of a crowd of 15,000 to clinch their first and only East German cup title.

Thale started into their first Oberliga season in 1950–51 with the same successful team. At the end of the season, the club came in seventh with 17 wins from 34 matches and were the best promoted team of the season. Striker Werner Oberländer was the third-best goal scorer of the season with 31 goals. After a weaker 1951–52 season, where the club placed 13th out of 19 teams, they reached their best Oberliga result, placing fifth in the 1952–53 season. In the 1953–54 season, however, with only four wins and the worst goal difference of all teams with 28:59, Thale placed last and was relegated to the DDR-Liga.

Football between the second and third tiers 
In the 1954–55 season, Thale was unlucky in that the DDR-Liga was reduced from three divisions to one. Since their seventh place was not sufficient for qualification for the new format, they faced the second relegation in a row. The team spent the next seven years in the third-tier II. DDR-Liga until its abandonment in 1963, resulting in a move to the less prestigious Bezirksliga Halle. It took another twelve years at the third level of East German football until Thale won the Bezirksliga in 1976 and thereby qualified for the DDR-Liga. Although the league only had very little sporting value after being expanded to five divisions, Thale finished ninth out of twelve teams in 1977 and were relegated back to the Bezirksliga as second to last in 1978. There, the team could regenerate, won the Bezirksliga again and spent the next five years in the DDR-Liga. They spent three more seasons in the Bezirksliga from 1984 to 1987. By then, the DDR-Liga had been reduced to two divisions again and the Bezirksliga champions had to participate in promotion play-off rounds. While Thale failed to win this play-off in 1985, they were promoted back to the DDR-Liga a year later and managed to stay there until the end of East German football, even finishing the 1987–88 season as runners-up of the southern division.

League statistics 1946–1990 
 1946–1948 Kreisklasse Quedlinburg
 1948–49 Bezirksklasse Sachsen-Anhalt
 1949–50 Landesklasse Sachsen-Anhalt
 1950–1954 DDR-Oberliga
 1954–55 DDR-Liga
 1955–1963 II. DDR-Liga
 1963–1976 Bezirksliga Halle
 1976–1978 DDR-Liga
 1978–79 Bezirksliga Halle
 1979–1984 DDR-Liga
 1984–1987 Bezirksliga Halle
 1987–1990 DDR-Liga

Since 1990 
The club was re-founded after the German reunification in 1990 and was integrated in the southern division of the newly created fourth-tier NOFV-Liga Nordost, finishing the inaugural 1990–91 season in third place. In 1992, the football team wanted to separate themselves from the rest of the club and founded Sportvereinigung Thale 04 to commemorate the club of the same name founded in 1904. However, the newly created team had too little sporting substance and was therefore relegated to the fifth-tier Verbandsliga Sachsen-Anhalt at the end of the 1992–93 season. After relegation to the sixth-tier Landesliga in the 1999–2000 season, the new club was disbanded and the team returned to SV Stahl Thale in 2001. After spending the 2002–03 season in the seventh-tier Kreisliga Quedlinburg, they were promoted back to the Landesliga in 2005. At the end of the 2010–11 season, the club was relegated to the eighth-tier Landesklasse Sachsen-Anhalt. In 2013, they returned to the Landesliga for five seasons before dropping to the Landesklasse again.

League statistics since 2000 
 2000–02 Landesliga Sachsen-Anhalt
 2002–03 Kreisliga Quedlinburg
 2003–05 Landesklasse Sachsen-Anhalt
 2005–11 Landesliga Sachsen-Anhalt
 2011–13 Landesklasse Sachsen-Anhalt
 2013–18 Landesliga Sachsen-Anhalt
 since 2018 Landesklasse Sachsen-Anhalt

Other divisions 
SV Stahl Thale has more than forty divisions participating in twelve sports. The largest divisions are football and handball at different skill levels, followed by tennis and volleyball. The other divisions are mainly active in leisure sports.
 Women's football
 Handball
 Volleyball
 Badminton
 Boxing
 Mountaineering
 Cross-country skiing
 Dancing
 Athletics
 Fistball
 Basketball
 Tennis
 Martial arts
 Gymnastics
 Health sports
 Disabled sports

References

External links 
 Official homepage 
 Chronicle 100 years of football in Thale 
 Official supporters' club 

Football clubs in Germany
Football clubs in East Germany
Football clubs in Saxony-Anhalt
Thale
Multi-sport clubs in Germany
Association football clubs established in 1990
1990 establishments in Germany